The year 1858 in architecture involved some significant events.

Events
 The competition to design Central Park in New York City is won by Frederick Law Olmsted and Calvert Vaux.
 Eugène Viollet-le-Duc begins publication of his Entretiens sur l'architecture in book form, systematizing his approach to architecture and architectural education in a method radically opposed to that of the École des Beaux-Arts, and notable for its use of drawings in axonometric projection.

Buildings and structures

Buildings

 The Hamilton Mausoleum in Scotland is completed to an 1842 design by David Hamilton by David Bryce with sculptor Alexander Handyside Ritchie.
 Saint Isaac's Cathedral in Saint Petersburg (Russia) is completed to an 1818 design by Auguste de Montferrand.
 Trinity Church (Oslo) in Norway, designed by Alexis de Chateauneuf and Wilhelm von Hanno, is consecrated.
 Wesley Church, Melbourne, Australia, is opened.
 Leopoldstädter Tempel (synagogue) in Vienna, designed by Ludwig Förster, is built.
 Grand Synagogue of Aden is built.
 Church of the Resurrection in Katowice (Poland) is completed.
 Fishergate Baptist Church in Preston, Lancashire (England), designed by James Hibbert and Nathan Rainford, is completed.
 Leeds Town Hall in Yorkshire (England), designed by Cuthbert Brodrick, is completed.
 Ontario County Courthouse in Canandaigua, New York, is built.
 United States Customhouse and Post Office (Bath, Maine) is built.
 The Liverpool, London and Globe Building (insurance office) in Liverpool (England), designed by C. R. Cockerell, is completed.
 The West of England and South Wales Bank in Bristol (England), designed by Bruce Gingell and T. R. Lysaght, is completed.
 The rebuilt Royal Opera House, Covent Garden, London, designed by Edward Middleton Barry, is completed.
 St James's Hall (concert hall), Piccadilly, London, designed by Owen Jones, is opened.
 Hownes Gill Viaduct in County Durham, England, designed by Thomas Bouch, is opened.
 New westwork at Speyer Cathedral (Bavaria), designed by Heinrich Hübsch, is completed.
 Construction of Woodchester Mansion (Spring Park) in Gloucestershire, England, designed by Benjamin Bucknall, is begun; work is abandoned in the 1870s.

Awards
 RIBA Royal Gold Medal – Friedrich August Stüler.
 Grand Prix de Rome, architecture: Georges-Ernest Coquart.

Births
 March 9 – Gustav Stickley, American furniture designer and architect (died 1942)
 August 9 – John William Simpson, English architect (died 1933)
 October 30 – Wilson Eyre, American architect (died 1944)
 December 26 – Torolf Prytz, Norwegian architect, goldsmith and Liberal politician (died 1938)
 Leonard Stokes, English architect (died 1925)

Deaths
 February 19 – Alexander Black, Scottish architect (born c.1790)
 February 24 – Thomas Hamilton, Scottish architect (born 1784)
 June 28 – Auguste de Montferrand, French-born architect (born 1786)
 November 12 – Edward Cresy, English architect and civil engineer (born 1792)
 November 14 – Benjamin Green, English architect (born 1813)

References

Architecture
Years in architecture
19th-century architecture